The Children of Huang Shi (working title: The Bitter Sea, also known as Escape from Huang Shi and Children of the Silk Road) is a 2008 historical war drama film directed by Roger Spottiswoode, and starring Jonathan Rhys Meyers, Chow Yun-fat, Radha Mitchell and Michelle Yeoh. The film centers on the true story of George Hogg and the sixty orphans that he led across China in an effort to save them from conscription during the Second Sino-Japanese war.

Plot summary
George Hogg (Jonathan Rhys-Meyers) is a young British journalist from Hertfordshire. In 1938, a year after the Japanese invasion of northern China and occupation of central coastal areas, he sneaks into Nanjing, China, by pretending to be a Red Cross aid worker. Arriving in Nanjing, Hogg witnesses and photographs the poverty, ruins, and corpses on the streets.  He proceeds to write a daily journal about his findings when he is interrupted by the sounds from outside. Upon peering outside the window, Hogg witnesses Japanese soldiers round up Chinese refugees and proceed to massacre the group. He anxiously takes photos of this event by the window. Later at night, Hogg is captured by the Japanese while photographing them committing atrocities. He is about to be executed when Chen Hansheng (Chow Yun-fat), a Chinese communist resistance fighter, saves him. While hiding in the rubble with Hansheng, Hogg witnesses the execution of two of his colleagues by the Japanese. Overwhelmed by shock, he inadvertently reveals their presence. A firefight ensues, and Hogg is wounded. He wakes up to Lee Pearson (Radha Mitchell), checking on his wounds and discovers he has been brought to a rebel camp. With nowhere to go for now, Hansheng tells Hogg, on Lee's suggestion, to rest at an orphanage housing 56 young boys and only an aged grandmother to take care of them. However, on the night of his arrival, Hogg is called out by one of the boys to a strange location, and he is savagely attacked with sticks by the orphans.  Thankfully, Lee arrives just in time and threatens to abandon the boys, leaving them without medical supplies or food. Lee explains to Hogg that she runs the orphanage and drops by from time to time with supplies.

The next day, at Lee's insistence, Hogg helps her to convince the boys that the treatment of lice by flea powder does not hurt. Lee's demonstration of the treatment on a naked Hogg, in the middle of the courtyard, manages to convince the boys and they all promptly accept treatment. However, Lee asks Hogg to take care of the boys and states that she will be leaving for two months from March to May. Lee also leaves Hogg and the orphans with a mule. However, Hogg replies that he has no intention to stay at the orphanage, but instead wants to go to the front lines to write, and spread the word about the war. As Hogg is leaving, he spots the grandmother looking down at him, and he reflects on his short memory at the orphanage. Reluctantly, he returns to take care of the children. Over the course of the next few days Hogg gains the boys' respect by repairing the lighting, cleaning up the old school (which is the orphanage), and being their teacher. However, as for food, the grandmother had previously shown Hogg with a handful of maggot-infested rice, that there was close to nothing to feed the boys.

Hogg makes a trip to town with one of the boys to seek a well-known and wealthy lady, Mrs. Wang (Michelle Yeoh), with a business deal in mind. Aware that Mrs. Wang only wanted to deal with cash transactions, Hogg still proposed to Mrs. Wang that he'd be able to provide her with vegetables if she supplied him with food and seeds for now. (A later scene would reveal that the war made Mrs. Wang flexible and compassionate toward others and therefore privately willing to barter without cash) Mrs. Wang tested Hogg to see if he possessed the agricultural knowledge so by asking him to identify certain seeds. Hogg passes the test easily and returns with the boy to the orphanage leading his mule full of food and seeds. He starts to plow the land beside the orphanage and with the help of one of the orphans, successfully grows a flourishing vegetable garden along with beautiful and tall stalks of sunflowers.

Fleeing from the Nationalists who want to conscript the boys into their army to fight the Japanese, they make a three-month journey across the snow-bound Liu Pan Shan mountains to safety on the edge of the Mongolian desert, the first 900 km on foot. To their relief, for the last part of the journey they are supplied with four trucks.

At the destination they are supplied with a building that they turn into a new orphanage. In 1945 Hogg dies of tetanus. This was foreshadowed by Lee, when she had described the horrors of the disease to him earlier.

The film features the Rape of Nanking and the Japanese "kill all, burn all, loot all" practices, and ends with a few brief interview snippets with some of the surviving orphans.

Cast

Critical reception
The film received mixed reviews from Western critics. The review aggregator Rotten Tomatoes reported that 31% of critics gave the film positive reviews, based on 71 reviews. Metacritic reported the film had an average score of 49 out of 100, based on 22 reviews. The New York Times gave the film an overall positive review, praising the acting and its "realistic depiction of war-ravaged China".

The film has been criticized for ignoring the role of Rewi Alley, a Communist New Zealander celebrated in China's revolution. Conversion of the nurse played by Radha Mitchell from a New Zealander (Kathleen Hall, associated with Alley) to an American also received negative attention. The omission of Alley in particular has been called a blatant misrepresentation by at least one critic.

Awards & nominations 
 AACTA Award for Best Production Design: Steven Jones-Evans (Nomination)
 AACTA Award for Best Costume Design: Kym Barrett & Wenyan Gao (Nomination)
 Australian Screen Music Award for Feature Film Scores: David Hirschfelder (Won)
 Young Artist Award for Best Performance in an International Feature Film - Leading Young Performers: Guang Li (Nomination)

Box office performance
The film grossed around $7.4 million worldwide, including $1.6 million in China and Spain, and $1 million in the U.S. and Australia.

Film and history
The original author of this movie, James MacManus, said "His entry to China was February 1938. He did not go to Nanjing. The movie has been dramatized. It's not the fact." Hogg wrote travel writings. But articles that he saw atrocities have not been found in the archives of Associated Press and United Press International.

References

External links

James MacManus (scriptwriter). "The long march of a forgotten English hero". Times Online. February 12, 2007.

2008 films
2000s adventure drama films
2000s historical films
2000s war drama films
APRA Award winners
Chinese docudrama films
Films set in 1938
Films set in 1945
Nanjing Massacre films
Chinese drama films
Sony Pictures Classics films
Huangshi
Films directed by Roger Spottiswoode
Films scored by David Hirschfelder
Second Sino-Japanese War films
2008 drama films
Australian drama films
2000s English-language films